Tolmachyov or Tolmachev is a Russian masculine surname, its feminine counterpart is Tolmachyova or Tolmacheva. It may refer to:

Aleksandr Tolmachev, Russian journalist
Dmitri Tolmachyov (born 1996), Russian football player 
Oleg Tolmachev (1919–2008), Soviet ice hockey player and coach
Tatiana Tolmacheva (1907–1998), Soviet figure skater and coach
 Vladimir Tolmachyov (footballer) (born 1996), Russian football player
 Vladimir Tolmachyov (politician) (1887–1937), Soviet politician and statesman

See also
Tolmachev Dol

Russian-language surnames